The Cape St. Paul Lighthouse was built in 1901 near Woe, Ghana.

It has a skeletal pyramidal base with the upper third enclosed and housing the lantern and gallery.

See also

 List of lighthouses in Ghana

References

Lighthouses completed in 1901
Lighthouses in Ghana